The Symphony No. 33 in B major, K. 319, was written by Wolfgang Amadeus Mozart, and dated on 9 July 1779.

Structure

The symphony has 4 movements, and is scored for strings, 2 oboes, 2 bassoons, and 2 horns, the smallest orchestral force employed in his last ten symphonies:

Allegro assai, in sonata form. The development section of this movement is based on a theme that does not appear in the exposition : the four-note figure that will become the principal theme of the Jupiter Symphony.
Andante moderato in E major, in modified sonata form, order of first and second subjects reversed in the recapitulation
Menuetto, in ternary form
Finale: Allegro assai, in sonata form

The autograph score is today preserved in the Biblioteka Jagiellońska, in Kraków.

References

External links

33
1779 compositions
Compositions in B-flat major